Fenerbahçe Ülker is the professional men's basketball department of Fenerbahçe S.K., a major multisport club based in Istanbul, Turkey.

For the season roster: 2013-14 Roster

Group A regular season

Fixtures/results
All times given below are in Central European Time.

Group E Top 16

Fixtures/results
All times given below are in Central European Time.

External links
Official Fenerbahçe site 
Euro League Page 
TBLStat.net 
Euroleague Format
Euroleague.net
Fenerbahçe fansite

References

2013–14
2013–14 Euroleague by club
2013–14 in Turkish basketball by club